Erythrina vespertilio is a tree native to north and north-east Australia. Its common names are grey corkwood, bat's wing coral tree, yulbah  and the more ambiguous "bean tree". In the Western Desert language it is also known as ininti.

Description
It has thorns on the trunk and branches with bark that is deeply furrowed and corky and creamy-grey in colour.

The leaflets have a broad wedge-shape with three lobes, resembling a bat's open wings. The species is deciduous in the dry season.

There are usually ten stamens. Flowering usually occurs when the tree is leafless.

Distribution
E. vespertilio is found on all mainland states except Victoria, mainly in open woodlands but extends to arid areas and rainforest margins. It is found in the Kimberley, Pilbara and northern Goldfields-Esperance regions of Western Australia. throughout most of the Northern Territory and Queensland, northern South Australia and north eastern New South Wales. It grows in a wide range of soils as long as drainage is good and it has a position in full sun.

Classification
The species was first formally described by the botanist George Bentham in 1848 as part of Thomas Mitchell's work Journal of an Expedition into the Interior of Tropical Australia.

There are two synonyms Corallodendron vespertilio and Erythrina biloba, and the name of this species is often misapplied to Erythrina numerosa.

There are two known subspecies:
 Erythrina vespertilio subsp. biloba F.Muell. & A.R.Bean
 Erythrina vespertilio subsp. vespertilio

Uses
It was widely traditionally used by Aboriginal Australians in Central Australia for making woomeras and coolamons. The Warlpiri, among others, would use the wood to make shields, used either for warfare or ceremonially. These shields could then be used for making fire with the friction method.

The bark is also considered to have traditional medicinal uses. The fruit contains alkaloids and the stem contains isoflavonoids. Phaseollidin (a flavonoid) showed cytotoxic activities in vitro against prostate cancer cell lines at high doses.

The seeds are used to make decorations.

References 

vespertilio
Flora of Queensland
Flora of the Northern Territory
Rosids of Western Australia
Flora of South Australia
Flora of New South Wales
Australian Aboriginal bushcraft
Fabales of Australia
Bush medicine
Medicinal plants of Australia
Trees of Australia
Drought-tolerant trees
Plants described in 1848